Mohtashim Ali (born 21 July 1981) is a Pakistani cricketer who has made more than 100 first-class appearances. He made his first-class debut on 2 January 2002, for Rest of Baluchistan in the 2001–02 Quaid-e-Azam Trophy. He made his Twenty20 debut on 1 December 2013, for State Bank of Pakistan in the 2013–14 Faysal Bank T20 Cup for Departments.

References

External links
 

1981 births
Living people
Pakistani cricketers
State Bank of Pakistan cricketers
Karachi Whites cricketers
Karachi Zebras cricketers
Quetta cricketers
Kalutara Town Club cricketers